Fishermans Airfield (also known as Daugo Island Airfield) is a former World War II airfield near Port Moresby, Papua New Guinea. It was part of a multiple-airfield complex in the Port Moresby area, located offshore of Port Moresby. The island's name is derived from the names of the island's two villages - Dag (on the western tip) and Ugo (eastern tip). It is also known as Fisherman's Island.

The airfield on the island was built by the RAAF c. 1944 as an emergency airfield. It was abandoned and has been disused since the war.

See also

 USAAF in the Southwest Pacific
 Port Moresby Airfield Complex
 Kila Airfield (3 Mile Drome)
 Wards Airfield (5 Mile Drome)
 Jackson Airfield (7 Mile Drome)
 Berry Airfield (12 Mile Drome)
 Schwimmer Airfield (14 Mile Drome)
 Durand Airfield (17 Mile Drome)
 Rogers (Rarona) Airfield (30 Mile Drome)

References

 Maurer, Maurer (1983). Air Force Combat Units Of World War II. Maxwell AFB, Alabama: Office of Air Force History. .
 www.pacificwrecks.com

External links

Airfields of the United States Army Air Forces in Papua New Guinea
Airports established in 1944
1944 establishments in the Territory of Papua